Magnification is the enlargement of an image.

Magnification may also refer to:

 Exaggeration
 Magnification (album), a 2001 album by the rock band Yes
 Voltage magnification, of a series resonant circuit
 Current magnification, of a parallel resonant circuit
 Biomagnification, an increase in concentration of a substance as a food chain is climbed